Diane Holmes is a former Ottawa City Councillor representing Somerset Ward which consists of Centretown, Centretown West and the downtown core. She was born and raised in Montreal, Quebec, and graduated from McGill University with a degree in Physical Education. She taught at McGill and the University of Toronto before moving to Ottawa.

She was first elected to Ottawa city council in 1982 in a surprise victory over veteran alderman Joe Cassey. On city council, her priorities include housing, urban planning, community development, transportation, social services, women's issues and social justice causes. As a previous head of Heritage Ottawa she worked to preserve heritage structures.  She was easily re-elected in 1985 and 1988.  She considered a bid for the mayoralty in 1991, but ended up supporting fellow progressive Nancy Smith who came in a strong second (36%) to Jacquelin Holzman (40%). Holmes was easily re-elected to council in 1991.

In 1994 Holmes moved to the council of the Regional Municipality of Ottawa-Carleton, facing little opposition in her bid. She was acclaimed in 1997 and retired from council in 2000 when the regional municipality was abolished and replaced with the new amalgamated City of Ottawa. In 2003 she returned to city council, winning another convincing victory in her previous ward. Holmes was similarly re-elected in 2006.

Holmes supported a bylaw to require property owners to promptly remove graffiti.

Holmes was re-elected in the 2010 municipal election, but didn't seek re-election in 2014.

References

External links
Official site
2010 campaign site
City biography

Ottawa city councillors
McGill University Faculty of Education alumni
Women municipal councillors in Canada
Living people
Women in Ontario politics
Ottawa-Carleton regional councillors
Politicians from Montreal
20th-century Canadian politicians
20th-century Canadian women politicians
21st-century Canadian politicians
21st-century Canadian women politicians
Year of birth missing (living people)